Buster is a surname. Notable people with the surname include:

Budd Buster (1891-1965), American actor known for B western films
John Buster (born 1941), American physician, director of the team that performed the first embryo transfer resulting in a live birth in 1984

See Also
Buster (nickname)
Buster (disambiguation)